Meir Kalmanson,; better known by his stage name Meir Kay, is an American Internet personality best known for his inspirational Vlogs and interviews on YouTube, which have amassed over 350 million views and his social media presence with upwards of one million followers. He is known for his interviews with inspirational people and Vlogs, where he posts updates about obscure places, including a Bolivian mine and while rafting down the Amazon. He makes YouTube videos showcasing random acts of kindness.

Personal life
Born in Brooklyn, NY, Kalmanson was raised in New Haven, CT. He is affiliated with the Chabad movement of Judaism. He attended Rabbinical school in Singapore, and afterwards felt called to spread kindness and joy in unexpected ways, by video. He began this career in March 2010 and uploaded his first YouTube video titled "Bubby Luba's Song”, inspired by his grandmother. He was encouraged by friends to continue  uploading videos to the site. 

Kalmanson posts videos, usually including himself in the videos to showcase kindness, joy, acceptance, empathy, sharing, diversity, inclusion and celebration of life. He enjoys filming unexpected social experiments. His style of comedy leans towards storytelling, satire as well as re-examining social and societal norms.

Career

YouTube

A Valuable Lesson For A Happier Life
One of his most popular videos, it has been viewed on Facebook more than 270 million times on Meir Kay's page alone. In this video, a professor (played by Kim Emerson) gives an important lesson about time management focusing on the important things in life. The professor takes out an empty jar and fills it with first golf balls, followed by pebbles, sand, and finally beer. Every time he fills the jar with something, he asks his students if the jar appears full. Inevitably, they answer yes, only to be proven wrong as each new element is added. This video was uploaded on December 14, 2016, and has been translated into many languages. During an interview, Meir has said that his goal is to spread joy, positivity and inspiration for others to pass on kindness, through the videos that he creates.

Kids decide between helping the Homeless or Ice Cream
In this video, Kalmanson was seen in an ice cream van and gave children a dollar to observe how they went about spending it. This video was uploaded on May 27, 2015, and currently has almost 10.5 million views. This video was noticed by several media houses seeing kids giving money to homeless instead of buying ice cream for themselves.

The Most Generous Boy In The World!
His video "The Most Generous Boy In The World!" was posted on May 16, 2017, and currently has over 5 million views. It features Kalmanson playing a waiter in a food chain, where a kid comes with limited money and couldn’t order what he wanted. He orders an ice cream and left a thank you note with the tip.

High Five New York
His video "High Five New York" was posted on September 14, 2014, and used to be the most popular video by Kalmanson. He was seen giving a High Five to the people who stuck out their hands to hail a taxi in New York City.

See also 
 Adina Sash
 Ayelet the Kosher Komic
 Mendy Pellin

References

External links
 
 Meir Kay on Facebook

Living people
Year of birth missing (living people)
People from Brooklyn
American Internet celebrities
American Orthodox Jews
Orthodox and Hasidic Jewish comedians